In statistics, a generalized p-value is an extended version of the classical p-value, which except in a limited number of applications, provides only approximate solutions.

Conventional statistical methods do not provide exact solutions to many statistical problems, such as those arising in mixed models and MANOVA, especially when the problem involves a number of nuisance parameters. As a result, practitioners often resort to approximate statistical methods or asymptotic statistical methods that are valid only when the sample size is large. With small samples, such methods often have poor performance. Use of approximate and asymptotic methods may lead to misleading conclusions or may fail to detect truly significant results from experiments.

Tests based on generalized p-values are exact statistical methods in that they are based on exact probability statements.  While conventional statistical methods do not provide exact solutions to such problems as testing variance components or ANOVA under unequal variances, exact tests for such problems can be obtained based on generalized p-values.

In order to overcome the shortcomings of the classical p-values, Tsui and Weerahandi extended the classical definition so that one can obtain exact solutions for such problems as the Behrens–Fisher problem and testing variance components. This is accomplished by allowing test variables to depend on observable random vectors as well as their observed values, as in the Bayesian treatment of the problem, but without having to treat constant parameters as random variables.

Example

To describe the idea of generalized p-values in a simple example, consider a situation of sampling from a normal population with the mean , and the variance . Let  and  be the sample mean and the sample variance. Inferences on all unknown parameters can be based on the distributional results

and

Now suppose we need to test the coefficient of variation, . While the problem is not trivial with conventional p-values, the task can be easily accomplished based on the generalized test variable

Therefore, a test of a hypothesis with a one-sided alternative such as  can be based on the generalized p-value , a quantity that can be easily evaluated via Monte Carlo simulation or using the non-central t-distribution.

Notes

References

Gamage J, Mathew T, and Weerahandi S. (2013). Generalized prediction intervals for BLUPs in mixed models, Journal of Multivariate Analysis}, 220, 226-233.
Hamada, M., and Weerahandi, S. (2000). Measurement System Assessment via Generalized Inference. Journal of Quality Technology, 32, 241-253.
Krishnamoorthy, K. and Tian, L. (2007), “Inferences on the ratio of means of two inverse Gaussian distributions: the generalized variable approach”, Journal of Statistical Planning and Inferences, Volume 138, Issue 7, 1, Pages 2082-2089.
Li, X., Wang J., Liang H. (2011). Comparison of several means: a fiducial based approach. Computational Statistics and Data Analysis, 55, 1993-2002.
 Mathew, T. and Webb, D. W. (2005).  Generalized  p-values and confidence intervals for variance components: Applications to Army test and evaluation, Technometrics, 47, 312-322.
Wu, J. and Hamada, M. S. (2009) Experiments: Planning, Analysis, and Optimization. Wiley, Hoboken, New Jersey.
Zhou, L., and Mathew, T. (1994). Some Tests for Variance Components Using Generalized p-Values, Technometrics,  36, 394-421.
Tian, L. and Wu, Jianrong (2006) “Inferences on the Common Mean of Several Log-normal  Populations: The Generalized Variable Approach”, Biometrical Journal.
Tsui, K. and Weerahandi, S. (1989): "Generalized p-values in significance testing of hypotheses in the presence of nuisance parameters". Journal of the American Statistical Association,  84, 602–607
Weerahandi, S. (1995)  Exact Statistical Methods for Data Analysis   Springer-Verlag, New York.

External links
 XPro, Free software package for exact parametric statistics

Statistical hypothesis testing